Aljoša Buha (4 January 1962 – 18 September 1986) was a Bosnian musician best known for having played in two bands: Kongres and Crvena Jabuka.

Early life
Aljoša Buha was born in Ljubljana to a Herzegovinian Serb father Krsto Buha from the village of Balabani near Gacko and Slovenian mother Vida Tribušon from Nova Gorica. His parents met and married in Ljubljana where his father had arrived for metallurgy studies at the University of Ljubljana. Shortly after Aljoša's birth, the family moved to Zenica where his father got a job at Zenica Ironworks.

Growing up in Zenica's Pišće neighbourhood, Buha was musically inclined from a young age. With his friend and neighbour from the same apartment building Darko "Cunja" Jelčić, Buha played in a band called Flota. Buha's mother died in March 1980 when Buha was eighteen. After graduating high school in Zenica and going off to serve his mandatory Yugoslav People's Army (JNA) military stint, Buha went to Sarajevo for university studies, enrolling at the University of Sarajevo's Faculty of Philosophy. His widowed father re-married in the meantime and Buha's half-sister Lidija was born in 1982.

Musical career

Kongres
In 1982, twenty-year-old Buha started playing bass in the newly-founded new wave / synth-pop band Kongres (Congress) in Sarajevo. Formed and run by Adam Subašić, a twenty-four-year-old drummer from Sanski Most who had, much like Buha, arrived to Sarajevo for university studies, the band also featured vocalist and guitarist Mahir Purivatra, keyboardist Dado Džihan, and second vocalist Emir Cerić. The band often crossed paths on the Sarajevo scene with Zabranjeno Pušenje and Elvis J. Kurtović & His Meteors, two young bands behind the budding New Primitive club scene in the city, however, since Kongres' sound and stylistic sensibility didn't overlap much with New Primitivism, the association always remained a cursory one.

By 1984, Džihan and Cerić left Kongres while Edo Gradinčić joined as Džihan's replacement. Throughout the summer of 1984, the band recorded their debut album Zarjavele trobente in RTV Sarajevo's studio. Produced by Mahmud "Paša" Ferović, the album was released by Diskoton in October 1984.

Crvena Jabuka
Aljoša Buha was recruited in Crvena Jabuka in 1986 as a bass player. He was also among the other members Darko Jelčić, Dražen Žerić, Dražen Ričl, and Zlatko Arslanagić. Aljosa played bass on the band's self-titled debut album.

On 18 September 1986 Crvena Jabuka went to the concert in Mostar that would put their skills to the test and prove their popularity. Near Jablanica Aljoša Buha died in a car accident, along with Dražen Ričl. He died immediately with severe wounds and Ričl was transported to Belgrade in a helicopter and died 13 days thereafter.

Buha was buried in his hometown of Zenica.

References

 
 
 
 

Yugoslav musicians
Musicians from Zenica
Bosnia and Herzegovina bass guitarists
Bosnia and Herzegovina male guitarists
1961 births
1986 deaths
Road incident deaths in Bosnia and Herzegovina
Bosnia and Herzegovina people of Slovenian descent
20th-century bass guitarists
20th-century male musicians
Serbs of Bosnia and Herzegovina